Jeffrey Allan Feagles (born March 7, 1966) is a former American football punter who played in the National Football League (NFL) for twenty-two seasons.  He played college football for the University of Miami.  He was originally signed by the New England Patriots as an undrafted free agent in 1988, and most recently played for the New York Giants.

Feagles is known for using the "coffin corner" punt.  He earned Pro Bowl selections in 1995 and 2008 and won a Super Bowl ring with the Giants in Super Bowl XLII over the Patriots. Feagles, the most durable punter in NFL history, officially announced his retirement on April 30, 2010.  Feagles attended Gerard High School in Phoenix, Arizona and was a letterman in football, basketball, and baseball. In his 22-season career, Feagles never missed a game, which is an unmatched record.

College career
Following a single season at Scottsdale Community College, Feagles played college football at the University of Miami. He joined the Pi Kappa Alpha Fraternity during his time as an undergraduate. He won a national championship with Miami's 1987 team.
Feagles was inducted into the University of Miami Sports Hall of Fame at its 40th Annual Banquet on Wednesday, February 13, 2008, at Miami's Jungle Island.

Professional career

In the summer of 2004, during Feagles' second season with the New York Giants, he offered newly drafted quarterback Eli Manning his #10, which was the same number that Manning wore in college. In exchange, Feagles and his family received an all-expenses-paid vacation to Florida paid for by Manning. He switched to 17 until wide receiver Plaxico Burress wanted the number, Feagles sold the number to him in exchange for a new kitchen in his house.

2007 marked Feagles' 20th NFL season.  Prior to his affiliation with the New York Giants, he played for the New England Patriots, the Philadelphia Eagles, the Arizona Cardinals and the Seattle Seahawks.

He was a member of the New York Giants in their Super Bowl XLII win over the New England Patriots on February 3, 2008, the first, and only Super Bowl of his 20-year career. At 41 years, 10 months, 26 days of age, he was the oldest player to have played in a Super Bowl, until the Colts' Matt Stover broke the record in 2010.

Feagles earned his second career selection to the Pro Bowl in 2008.

On April 30, 2010, after the Giants opened mini-camp, Feagles announced his retirement. Giants head coach Tom Coughlin said about the retirement, "He is 44 years old. He worked very hard for approximately a month right after the season just to try to tell himself again that he could do this and wanted to be able to do it. And then ran into some -- as we went on and started the offseason program -- ran into some of the physical tests that you have to go through as you continue to advance almost on a weekly basis. He has a program which is unique to himself, but he is having some physical issues. And so he has decided to deal with them."

Feagles played 22 seasons and played in every single game, 352 games overall.  Feagles holds the NFL record for most consecutive games played in a career. Feagles, as of 2020, is 4th all-time in most games played in NFL history; only Morten Andersen, Adam Vinatieri, and Gary Anderson have played in more games than he.

NFL career statistics

Regular season

|-
! style="text-align:center;"| 1988
! style="text-align:center;"| NE
| 16 || 91 || 3,482 || 38.3 || 34.1 || 24 || 8
|-
! style="text-align:center;"| 1989
! style="text-align:center;"| NE
| 16 || 63 || 2,392 || 38.0 || 31.3 || 13 || 2
|-
! style="text-align:center;"| 1990
! style="text-align:center;"| PHI
| 16 || 72 || 3,026 || 42.0 || 35.5 || 20 || 3
|-
! style="text-align:center;"| 1991
! style="text-align:center;"| PHI
| 16 || style="background:#cfecec;"|87 || 3,640 || 41.8 || 34.0 || style="background:#cfecec;"|29 || style="background:#cfecec;"|11
|-
! style="text-align:center;"| 1992
! style="text-align:center;"| PHI
| 16 || 82 || 3,459 || 42.2 || 36.9 || 26 || 7
|-
! style="text-align:center;"| 1993
! style="text-align:center;"| PHI
| 16 || 83 || 3,323 || 40.0 || 35.3 || style="background:#cfecec;"|31 || 4
|-
! style="text-align:center;"| 1994
! style="text-align:center;"| ARI
| 16 || style="background:#cfecec;"|98 || 3,997 || 40.8 || 36.0 || 33 || 10
|-
! style="text-align:center;"| 1995
! style="text-align:center;"| ARI
| 16 || 72 || 3,150 || 43.8 || 38.2 || 20 || 8
|-
! style="text-align:center;"| 1996
! style="text-align:center;"| ARI
| 16 || 76 || 3,328 || 43.8 || 36.4 || 23 || 6
|-
! style="text-align:center;"| 1997
! style="text-align:center;"| ARI
| 16 || 91 || 4,028 || 44.3 || 36.8 || 24 || 10
|-
! style="text-align:center;"| 1998
! style="text-align:center;"| SEA
| 16 || 81 || 3,568 || 44.0 || 36.5 || 27 || 12
|-
! style="text-align:center;"| 1999
! style="text-align:center;"| SEA
| 16 || 84 || 3,425 || 40.8 || 35.2 || 34 || 5
|-
! style="text-align:center;"| 2000
! style="text-align:center;"| SEA
| 16 || 74 || 2,960 || 40.0 || 36.9 || 24 || 2
|-
! style="text-align:center;"| 2001
! style="text-align:center;"| SEA
| 16 || 85 || 3,730 || 43.9 || 36.4 || 26 || 7
|-
! style="text-align:center;"| 2002
! style="text-align:center;"| SEA
| 16 || 61 || 2,542 || 41.7 || 37.0 || 22 || 4
|-
! style="text-align:center;"| 2003
! style="text-align:center;"| NYG
| 16 || 90 || 3,641 || 40.5 || 33.9 || 31 || 6
|-
! style="text-align:center;"| 2004
! style="text-align:center;"| NYG
| 16 || 74 || 3,069 || 41.5 || 34.6 || 23 || 4
|-
! style="text-align:center;"| 2005
! style="text-align:center;"| NYG
| 16 || 73 || 3,070 || 42.1 || 37.0 || 26 || 3
|-
! style="text-align:center;"| 2006
! style="text-align:center;"| NYG
| 16 || 77 || 3,098 || 40.2 || 37.0 || 27 || 3
|-
! style="text-align:center;"| 2007
! style="text-align:center;background:#afe6ba;"| NYG
| 16 || 71 || 2,865 || 40.4 || 36.0 || 25 || 5
|-
! style="text-align:center;"| 2008
! style="text-align:center;"| NYG
| 16 || 64 || 2,814 || 44.0 || 40.2 || 23 || 5
|-
! style="text-align:center;"| 2009
! style="text-align:center;"| NYG
| 16 || 64 || 2,604 || 40.7 || 36.0 || 23 || 2
|-
|- class="sortbottom" style="background:#eee;"
! style="text-align:center;" colspan="2"|Career
! 352 || style="background:#e0cef2;"|1,713 || style="background:#e0cef2;"|71,211 || 41.6 || 35.9 || style="background:#e0cef2;"|554 || 127
|}

NFL Records
On November 27, 2005, Feagles broke the NFL record for consecutive games played, with 283. The record was previously held by Minnesota Vikings defensive end Jim Marshall who played from 1960 to 1979. His record stands at 352.

Feagles holds the following NFL records:
Most consecutive games played, career: 352
Most punts, career: 1,713
Most punts inside the 20, career: 497
Most punting yards, career: 71,211

Personal life 
Feagles is married to Michelle. They have four sons: Christopher (nicknamed C.J.), Blake, Trevor, and Zachary. Christopher was a punter for the University of North Carolina at Chapel Hill football team and played in the US Army high-school All-American game in 2008. Blake played wide receiver for UConn in 2013 and 2014. Zach is currently a punter at  Rutgers University and won the starting job as a freshman in 2017. Trevor did not pursue collegiate football, but currently attends Loyola University Maryland.

Feagles currently resides in Ridgewood, New Jersey where he is a residential and commercial real estate agent for Keller Williams.
He is also a member of the New York Giants Broadcast Team responsible for pre- and post-game radio content along with analysis on the Fox Giants Post Game Live show.

Upon his retirement, Feagles was the last active player to appear in the NES classic video game, Tecmo Super Bowl.

See also
Iron man

References

1966 births
Living people
American football punters
Arizona Cardinals players
Miami Hurricanes football players
New England Patriots players
New York Giants players
Philadelphia Eagles players
Scottsdale Fighting Artichokes football players
Seattle Seahawks players
National Conference Pro Bowl players
People from Ridgewood, New Jersey
Players of American football from Anaheim, California
Players of American football from Phoenix, Arizona
Ed Block Courage Award recipients